List of aliens may refer to:

List of alleged extraterrestrial beings
List of fictional extraterrestrials
Lists of invasive species